Asilinae is a large subfamily of flies in the family Asilidae, the robber flies and assassin flies. It includes over 180 genera.

See also
 List of Asilinae genera

References

External links

 

 
Asilomorpha subfamilies